The Collegium Medico-Chirurgicum Josephinum or Josephinian Military Academy of Surgery (simply Josephinum for short) was an academy of military medicine founded in Vienna by Emperor Joseph II in 1784. In 1874 its functions were transferred to other institutions, and its building now houses the Josephinum Medical Museum of the Medical University of Vienna.

An image of the building featured on the 1987 issue of the 50 schilling note.

Directors
The first director of the Josephinum was the Italian surgeon Giovanni Alessandro Brambilla (1728–1800).

References

History of surgery
1784 establishments in Austria
1874 disestablishments in Austria
Buildings and structures in Vienna